Lt Colonel Cyril Bencraft Joly MC (9 September 1918 – 2000) was a British Army officer who served with 7th Armoured Division (Desert Rats) throughout the campaign in North Africa during World War II.

He described his experiences as a tank commander in the 2nd Royal Tank Regiment (2 RTR) in Take These Men (1955), a (lightly fictionalised) personal narrative of the Western Desert campaign that is regarded as a classic of its kind.

Life
He was born in Mengtes, Yunnan, China and died at Winchester in Hampshire.

Later in life he invented and patented an apparatus for providing a desired atmosphere in a sleeping space. It consisted of a frame for a bed with electrical fans to control the temperature.

In his later days he lived at Tregatillian near St Columb Major in Cornwall

Family
Henry Bencraft Joly (1857-1898; his grandfather) was British Vice-Consul in Macao and translator of Ts'ao Chan's Hung Lou Meng: The Dream of the Red Chamber, a Chinese Novel in Two Books.
He had three brothers. His only daughter, Vivien, married Hugh David Beddington, son of Keith Lionel Beddington CBE.

Works
1955 Take These Men (London, Constable and Company Ltd; reprinted Harmondsworth, Penguin Books, 1956; London, Buchan & Enright, 1985) 
1980 Silent Night: the defeat of NATO . London: Cassell 
 Operation Stille Nacht

References

1918 births
2000 deaths
Recipients of the Military Cross
British Army personnel of World War II
Royal Tank Regiment officers
20th-century British inventors